Simmern-Rheinböllen is a Verbandsgemeinde ("collective municipality") in the Rhein-Hunsrück-Kreis, Rhineland-Palatinate, Germany. The seat of the Verbandsgemeinde is in Simmern. It was formed on 1 January 2020 by the merger of the former Verbandsgemeinden Simmern and Rheinböllen.

The Verbandsgemeinde Simmern-Rheinböllen consists of the following Ortsgemeinden ("local municipalities"):

Altweidelbach
Argenthal
Belgweiler
Benzweiler
Bergenhausen
Biebern
Bubach
Budenbach
Dichtelbach
Ellern
Erbach
Fronhofen
Holzbach
Horn
Keidelheim
Kisselbach
Klosterkumbd
Külz
Kümbdchen
Laubach
Liebshausen
Mengerschied
Mörschbach
Mutterschied
Nannhausen
Neuerkirch
Niederkumbd
Ohlweiler
Oppertshausen
Pleizenhausen
Ravengiersburg
Rayerschied
Reich
Rheinböllen
Riegenroth
Riesweiler
Sargenroth
Schnorbach
Schönborn
Simmern
Steinbach
Tiefenbach
Wahlbach
Wüschheim

External links
Official website

Verbandsgemeinde in Rhineland-Palatinate